The Tribulations of Balthazar Kober  is a 1988 Polish film directed by Wojciech Jerzy Has, starring Rafal Wieczynski, Michael Lonsdale, Adrianna Biedrzyńska, Gabriela Kownacka, Emmanuelle Riva. The film is an adaptation of a novel by Frédérick Tristan that follows a young man as he travels across plague-stricken Germany of the 16th Century.

Plot
Young alchemy student Balthazar (Rafal Wieczynski) and his master (Michael Lonsdale) are forced to flee their home by the inquisition. They set off on a journey across a plague-stricken Germany, encountering various people including corrupt priests and Kabbalists, not to mention ghosts and even an angel, before ending up in Venice where Balthazar falls in love with a young actress.

The film is Has's final film, and marks a return to the picaresque, extravagant style of The Saragossa Manuscript and The Hourglass Sanatorium to which it can be seen as a part of a trilogy.

Cast
 Rafal Wieczynski as Balthasar Kober
 Michael Lonsdale as Le maître
 Adrianna Biedrzyńska as Rosa
 Gabriela Kownacka as Gertrude / Gertruda
 Emmanuelle Riva as La mère
 Daniel Emilfork as Le recteur
 Jerzy Bończak as Flamand - Varlet
 Zofia Merle as La matronne
 Evelyne Dassas as L'aubergiste
 Christine Laurent as Marguerite
 Andrzej Szczepkowski as Le cardinal / Kardinal Nenni
 Frédéric Leidgens as Battista Strozzi

Release
Released on December 26, 1988, the film was entered into the 1988 Polish Film Festival, where Janusz Rosól won the award for Best Sound. It was also nominated for the Golden Lion at the Venice Film Festival the same year, but did not win.

See also
 Cinema of Poland
 List of Polish-language films

References

External links
 

1988 films
Polish fantasy drama films
1980s Polish-language films
Films directed by Wojciech Has
Films based on French novels
Films set in the 16th century
Films set in the Holy Roman Empire